Jack Sarfatti (born September 14, 1939) is an American theoretical physicist. Working largely outside academia, most of Sarfatti's publications revolve around quantum physics and consciousness.

Sarfatti was a leading member of the Fundamental Fysiks Group, an informal group of physicists in California in the 1970s who, according to historian of science David Kaiser, aimed to inspire some of the investigations into quantum physics that underlie parts of quantum information science. Sarfatti co-wrote Space-Time and Beyond (1975; credited to Bob Toben and Fred Alan Wolf) and has self-published several books.

Background

Education
Sarfatti was born in Brooklyn, New York, to Hyman and Millie Sarfatti and raised in the borough's Midwood neighborhood. His father was born in Kastoria, Greece, and moved to New York as a child with his family.

After graduating from Midwood High School in 1956, Sarfatti attended Cornell University, where he received a B.A. in physics in 1960. Following graduate studies at Cornell and Brandeis University, he obtained an M.S. in 1967 from the University of California, San Diego and a Ph.D. in 1969 from the University of California, Riverside under Fred Cummings, both in physics; his dissertation was "Gauge Invariance in the Theory of Superfluidity."

Academic career
From 1967 to 1971, Sarfatti was an assistant professor of physics at San Diego State University. He also studied at the Cornell Space Science Center, the UK Atomic Energy Research Establishment, the Max Planck Institute for Physics, and International Centre for Theoretical Physics. Then he decided to leave academia around the time when he was in Trieste.

Sarfatti was invited to help shape the 100 Year Starship program.

Sarfatti's solution of David Chalmers's "hard problem" (i.e. how our conscious experiences are generated) has been explained in a paper by Paavo Pylkkänen.

Sarfatti claims to have been recruited by agents of the CIA and DOD to work on both the physics of consciousness and the propulsion of "flying saucers" back in the 1970s. MIT professor David Kaiser mentions these connections in his book How the Hippies Saved Physics. As evidence Sarfatti cites a recording of his 1973 meeting with Harold E. Puthoff, Russell Targ, and others on his visit to Stanford Research Institute.

Politics
According to Kaiser, Sarfatti's politics have leaned to the right since the early 1980s, when he became dependent on a cadre of "politically conservative thinkers who were drawn to certain New Age ideas" for research funding, following the dissolution of his relationship with Werner Erhard.

Others
A longtime habitué of Caffe Trieste, Sarfatti has been involved in the Fundamental Fysiks Group, the Esalen Institute-affiliated Physics–Consciousness Research Group, 100 Year Starship and some other research projects.

Selected works
Toben, Bob (1975). Space-Time and Beyond: Toward an Explanation of the Unexplainable. E.P. Dutton (Toben in conversation with Fred Alan Wolf and Jack Sarfatti).

References

Further reading
 Stardrive.org, Sarfatti's website
 Jack Sarfatti, academia.edu

1939 births
21st-century American physicists
American science writers
Cornell University alumni
Living people
People from Midwood, Brooklyn
Quantum mysticism advocates
Theoretical physicists
University of California, San Diego alumni
University of California, Riverside alumni
Midwood High School alumni
Scientists from Brooklyn